Dialectic (dialektikḗ; related to dialogue), also known as the dialectical method, is a discourse between two or more people holding different points of view about a subject but wishing to establish the truth through reasoned argumentation. Dialectic resembles debate, but the concept excludes subjective elements such as emotional appeal and rhetoric (in the modern pejorative sense). Dialectic may thus be contrasted with both the eristic, which refers to argument that aims to successfully dispute another's argument (rather than searching for truth), and the didactic method, wherein one side of the conversation teaches the other. Dialectic is alternatively known as minor logic, as opposed to major logic or critique.

Within Hegelianism, the word dialectic has the specialised meaning of a contradiction between ideas that serves as the determining factor in their relationship. Dialectical materialism, a theory or set of theories produced mainly by Karl Marx and Friedrich Engels, adapted the Hegelian dialectic into arguments regarding traditional materialism. The dialectics of Hegel and Marx were criticized in the twentieth century by the philosophers Karl Popper and Mario Bunge.

Dialectic tends to imply a process of evolution and so does not naturally fit within classical logics, but was given some formalism in the twentieth century. The emphasis on process is particularly marked in Hegelian dialectic, and even more so in Marxist dialectical logic, which tried to account for the evolution of ideas over longer time periods in the real world.

Western dialectical forms 
There is a variety of meanings of dialectic or dialectics within Western philosophy.

Classical philosophy 
In classical philosophy, dialectic is a form of reasoning based upon dialogue of arguments and counter-arguments, advocating propositions (theses) and counter-propositions (antitheses). The outcome of such a dialectic might be the refutation of a relevant proposition, or of a synthesis, or a combination of the opposing assertions, or a qualitative improvement of the dialogue.

Moreover, the term "dialectic" owes much of its prestige to its role in the philosophies of Socrates and Plato, in the Greek Classical period (5th to 4th centuries BC). Aristotle said that it was the pre-Socratic philosopher Zeno of Elea who invented dialectic, of which the dialogues of Plato are the examples of the Socratic dialectical method.

According to Kant, however, the ancient Greeks used the word "dialectic" to signify the logic of false appearance or semblance. To the Ancients, "it was nothing but the logic of illusion. It was a sophistic art of giving to one's ignorance, indeed even to one's intentional tricks, the outward appearance of truth, by imitating the thorough, accurate method which logic always requires, and by using its topic as a cloak for every empty assertion."

Socratic method 

The Socratic dialogues are a particular form of dialectic known as the method of elenchus (literally, "refutation, scrutiny") whereby a series of questions clarifies a more precise statement of a vague belief, logical consequences of that statement are explored, and a contradiction is discovered. The method is largely destructive, in that false belief is exposed and only constructive in that this exposure may lead to further search for truth. The detection of error does not amount to a proof of the antithesis; for example, a contradiction in the consequences of a definition of piety does not provide a correct definition. The principal aim of Socratic activity may be to improve the soul of the interlocutors, by freeing them from unrecognized errors; or indeed, by teaching them the spirit of inquiry.

In common cases, Socrates used enthymemes as the foundation of his argument.

For example, in the Euthyphro, Socrates asks Euthyphro to provide a definition of piety. Euthyphro replies that the pious is that which is loved by the gods. But, Socrates also has Euthyphro agreeing that the gods are quarrelsome and their quarrels, like human quarrels, concern objects of love or hatred. Therefore, Socrates reasons, at least one thing exists that certain gods love but other gods hate. Again, Euthyphro agrees. Socrates concludes that if Euthyphro's definition of piety is acceptable, then there must exist at least one thing that is both pious and impious (as it is both loved and hated by the gods)—which Euthyphro admits is absurd. Thus, Euthyphro is brought to a realization by this dialectical method that his definition of piety is not sufficiently meaningful.

In another example, in Plato's Gorgias, dialectic occurs between Socrates, the Sophist Gorgias, and two men, Polus and Callicles. Because Socrates' ultimate goal was to reach true knowledge, he was even willing to change his own views in order to arrive at the truth. The fundamental goal of dialectic, in this instance, was to establish a precise definition of the subject (in this case, rhetoric) and with the use of argumentation and questioning, make the subject even more precise. In the Gorgias, Socrates reaches the truth by asking a series of questions and in return, receiving short, clear answers.

Plato 
There is another interpretation of dialectic, suggested in The Republic, as a procedure that is both discursive and intuitive. In Platonism and Neoplatonism, dialectic assumes an ontological and metaphysical role in that it becomes the process whereby the intellect passes from sensibles to intelligibles, rising from Idea to Idea until it finally grasps the supreme Idea, the First Principle which is the origin of all. The philosopher is consequently a "dialectician". In this sense, dialectic is a process of enquiry that does away with hypotheses up to the First Principle (Republic, VII, 533 c-d). It slowly embraces the multiplicity in unity. Simon Blackburn writes that the dialectic in this sense is used to understand "the total process of enlightenment, whereby the philosopher is educated so as to achieve knowledge of the supreme good, the Form of the Good".

Aristotle 
Aristotle stresses that rhetoric is closely related to dialectic. He offers several formulas to describe this affinity between the two disciplines: first of all, rhetoric is said to be a "counterpart" (antistrophos) to dialectic (Rhet. I.1, 1354a1); (ii) it is also called an "outgrowth" (paraphues ti) of dialectic and the study of character (Rhet. I.2, 1356a25f.); finally, Aristotle says that rhetoric is part of dialectic and resembles it (Rhet. I.2, 1356a30f.). In saying that rhetoric is a counterpart to dialectic, Aristotle obviously alludes to Plato's Gorgias (464bff.), where rhetoric is ironically defined as a counterpart to cookery in the soul. Since, in this passage, Plato uses the word 'antistrophos' to designate an analogy, it is likely that Aristotle wants to express a kind of analogy too: what dialectic is for the (private or academic) practice of attacking and maintaining an argument, rhetoric is for the (public) practice of defending oneself or accusing an opponent. The analogy to dialectic has important implications for the status of rhetoric. Plato argued in his Gorgias that rhetoric cannot be an art (technê), since it is not related to a definite subject, while real arts are defined by their specific subjects, as e.g. medicine or shoemaking are defined by their products, i.e., health and shoes.

Medieval philosophy 
Logic, which could be considered to include dialectic, was one of the three liberal arts taught in medieval universities as part of the trivium; the other elements were rhetoric and grammar.

Based mainly on Aristotle, the first medieval philosopher to work on dialectics was Boethius (480–524). After him, many scholastic philosophers also made use of dialectics in their works, such as Abelard, William of Sherwood, Garlandus Compotista, Walter Burley, Roger Swyneshed, William of Ockham, and Thomas Aquinas.

This dialectic (a quaestio disputata) was formed as follows:
 The question to be determined ("It is asked whether...");
 A provisory answer to the question ("And it seems that...");
 The principal arguments in favor of the provisory answer;
 An argument against the provisory answer, traditionally a single argument from authority ("On the contrary...");
 The determination of the question after weighing the evidence ("I answer that...");
 The replies to each of the initial objections. ("To the first, to the second etc., I answer that...")

Modern philosophy 
The concept of dialectics was given new life at the start of the 19th century by Georg Wilhelm Friedrich Hegel (following Johann Gottlieb Fichte), whose dialectical model of nature and of history made dialectic a fundamental aspect of the nature of reality (instead of regarding the contradictions into which dialectics leads as a sign of the sterility of the dialectical method, as the 18th-century philosopher Immanuel Kant tended to do in his Critique of Pure Reason).

In the mid-19th century, the concept of dialectics was appropriated by Karl Marx (see, for example, Das Kapital, published in 1867) and Friedrich Engels and retooled in what they considered to be a nonidealistic manner. It would also become a crucial part of later representations of Marxism as a philosophy of dialectical materialism. These representations often contrasted dramatically and led to vigorous debate among different Marxist groupings.

Hegelian dialectic 

Hegelian dialectic, usually presented in a threefold manner, was stated by Heinrich Moritz Chalybäus as comprising three dialectical stages of development: a thesis, giving rise to its reaction; an antithesis, which contradicts or negates the thesis; and the tension between the two being resolved by means of a synthesis. Although this model is often named after Hegel, he never used that specific formulation. Hegel ascribed that terminology to Kant. Carrying on Kant's work, Fichte greatly elaborated on the synthesis model and popularized it.

On the other hand, Hegel did use a three-valued logical model that is very similar to the antithesis model, but Hegel's most usual terms were: Abstract-Negative-Concrete. Hegel used this writing model as a backbone to accompany his points in many of his works.

The formula, thesis-antithesis-synthesis, does not explain why the thesis requires an antithesis. However, the formula, abstract-negative-concrete, suggests a flaw, or perhaps an incompleteness, in any initial thesis—it is too abstract and lacks the negative of trial, error, and experience. For Hegel, the concrete, the synthesis, the absolute, must always pass through the phase of the negative, in the journey to completion, that is, mediation. This is the essence of what is popularly called Hegelian dialectics.

According to the German philosopher Walter Kaufmann: Fichte introduced into German philosophy the three-step of thesis, antithesis, and synthesis, using these three terms. Schelling took up this terminology. Hegel did not. He never once used these three terms together to designate three stages in an argument or account in any of his books. And they do not help us understand his Phenomenology, his Logic, or his philosophy of history; they impede any open-minded comprehension of what he does by forcing it into a scheme which was available to him and which he deliberately spurned [...] The mechanical formalism [...] Hegel derides expressly and at some length in the preface to the Phenomenology.G. E. Mueller (June 1958), "The Hegel Legend of 'Thesis-Antithesis-Synthesis", 166ff

Kaufmann also cites Hegel's criticism of the triad model commonly misattributed to him, adding that "the only place where Hegel uses the three terms together occurs in his lectures on the history of philosophy, on the last page but one of the sections on Kant—where Hegel roundly reproaches Kant for having 'everywhere posited thesis, antithesis, synthesis'".

To describe the activity of overcoming the negative, Hegel also often used the term Aufhebung, variously translated into English as "sublation" or "overcoming", to conceive of the working of the dialectic. Roughly, the term indicates preserving the useful portion of an idea, thing, society, etc., while moving beyond its limitations.

In the Logic, for instance, Hegel describes a dialectic of existence: first, existence must be posited as pure Being (Sein); but pure Being, upon examination, is found to be indistinguishable from Nothing (Nichts). When it is realized that what is coming into being is, at the same time, also returning to nothing (in life, for example, one's living is also a dying), both Being and Nothing are united as Becoming.

As in the Socratic dialectic, Hegel claimed to proceed by making implicit contradictions explicit: each stage of the process is the product of contradictions inherent or implicit in the preceding stage. For Hegel, the whole of history is one tremendous dialectic, major stages of which chart a progression from self-alienation as slavery to self-unification and realization as the rational constitutional state of free and equal citizens. The Hegelian dialectic cannot be mechanically applied for any chosen thesis. Critics argue that the selection of any antithesis, other than the logical negation of the thesis, is subjective. Then, if the logical negation is used as the antithesis, there is no rigorous way to derive a synthesis. In practice, when an antithesis is selected to suit the user's subjective purpose, the resulting "contradictions" are rhetorical, not logical, and the resulting synthesis is not rigorously defensible against a multitude of other possible syntheses. The problem with the Fichtean "thesis–antithesis–synthesis" model is that it implies that contradictions or negations come from outside of things. Hegel's point is that they are inherent in and internal to things. This conception of dialectics derives ultimately from Heraclitus.

Hegel stated that the purpose of dialectics is "to study things in their own being and movement and thus to demonstrate the finitude of the partial categories of understanding."

One important dialectical principle for Hegel is the transition from quantity to quality, which he terms the Measure. The measure is the qualitative quantum, the quantum is the existence of quantity. 

As an example, Hegel mentions the states of aggregation of water: "Thus the temperature of water is, in the first place, a point of no consequence in respect of its liquidity: still with the increase or diminution of the temperature of the liquid water, there comes a point where this state of cohesion suffers a qualitative change, and the water is converted into steam or ice". As other examples Hegel mentions the reaching of a point where a single additional grain makes a heap of wheat; or where the bald tail is produced, if we continue plucking out single hairs.

Another important principle for Hegel is the negation of the negation, which he also terms Aufhebung (sublation): Something is only what it is in its relation to another, but by the negation of the negation this something incorporates the other into itself. The dialectical movement involves two moments that negate each other, something and its other. As a result of the negation of the negation, "something becomes its other; this other is itself something; therefore it likewise becomes an other, and so on ad infinitum". Something in its passage into other only joins with itself, it is self-related. In becoming there are two moments: coming-to-be and ceasing-to-be: by sublation, i.e., negation of the negation, being passes over into nothing, it ceases to be, but something new shows up, is coming to be. What is sublated (aufgehoben) on the one hand ceases to be and is put to an end, but on the other hand it is preserved and maintained. In dialectics, a totality transforms itself; it is self-related, then self-forgetful, relieving the original tension.

Marxist dialectic 

Marxist dialectic is a form of Hegelian dialectic which applies to the study of historical materialism. It purports to be a reflection of the real world created by man. Dialectic would thus be a robust method under which one could examine personal, social, and economic behaviors. Marxist dialectic is the core foundation of the philosophy of dialectical materialism, which forms the basis of the ideas behind historical materialism.

Karl Marx and Friedrich Engels, writing several decades after Hegel's death, proposed that Hegel's dialectic is too abstract: 

In contradiction to Hegelian idealism, Marx presented his own dialectic method, which he claims to be "direct opposite" of Hegel's method: 

In Marxism, the dialectical method of historical study became intertwined with historical materialism, the school of thought exemplified by the works of Marx, Engels, and Vladimir Lenin. In the USSR, under Joseph Stalin, Marxist dialectics became "diamat" (short for dialectical materialism), a theory emphasizing the primacy of the material way of life; social praxis over all forms of social consciousness; and the secondary, dependent character of the "ideal".

The term "dialectical materialism" was coined by the 19th-century social theorist Joseph Dietzgen who used the theory to explain the nature of socialism and social development. The original populariser of Marxism in Russia, Georgi Plekhanov used the terms "dialectical materialism" and "historical materialism" interchangeably. For Lenin, the primary feature of Marx's "dialectical materialism" (Lenin's term) was its application of materialist philosophy to history and social sciences. Lenin's main input in the philosophy of dialectical materialism was his theory of reflection, which presented human consciousness as a dynamic reflection of the objective material world that fully shapes its contents and structure.

Later, Stalin's works on the subject established a rigid and formalistic division of Marxist–Leninist theory in the dialectical materialism and historical materialism parts. While the first was supposed to be the key method and theory of the philosophy of nature, the second was the Soviet version of the philosophy of history.

A dialectical method was fundamental to Western Marxists such as Karl Korsch and Georg Lukács. Certain members of the Frankfurt School also used dialectical thinking, such as Theodor W. Adorno who developed negative dialectics. Soviet academics, notably Evald Ilyenkov and Zaid Orudzhev, continued pursuing unorthodox philosophic study of Marxist dialectics; likewise in the West, notably the philosopher Bertell Ollman at New York University.

Friedrich Engels proposed that Nature is dialectical, thus, in Anti-Dühring he said that the negation of negation is: 

In Dialectics of Nature, Engels said: 

Marxist dialectics is exemplified in Das Kapital (Capital), which outlines two central theories: (i) surplus value and (ii) the materialist conception of history; Marx explains dialectical materialism: 

Class struggle is the primary contradiction to be resolved by Marxist dialectics, because of its central role in the social and political lives of a society. Nonetheless, Marx and Marxists developed the concept of class struggle to comprehend the dialectical contradictions between mental and manual labor, and between town and country. Hence, philosophic contradiction is central to the development of dialectics the progress from quantity to quality, the acceleration of gradual social change; the negation of the initial development of the status quo; the negation of that negation; and the high-level recurrence of features of the original status quo.

In the USSR, Progress Publishers issued anthologies of dialectical materialism by Lenin, wherein he also quotes Marx and Engels: 

Lenin describes his dialectical understanding of the concept of development: 

An example of the influence of Marxist dialectic in the European tradition is Jean-Paul Sartre's 1960 book Critique of Dialectical Reason. Sartre stated:

Dialectical naturalism 
Dialectical naturalism is a term coined by American philosopher Murray Bookchin to describe the philosophical underpinnings of the political program of social ecology. Dialectical naturalism explores the complex interrelationship between social problems, and the direct consequences they have on the ecological impact of human society. Bookchin offered dialectical naturalism as a contrast to what he saw as the "empyrean, basically antinaturalistic dialectical idealism" of Hegel, and "the wooden, often scientistic dialectical materialism of orthodox Marxists".

Theological dialectical forms

Dialectical theology 
Neo-orthodoxy, in Europe also known as theology of crisis and dialectical theology, is an approach to theology in Protestantism that was developed in the aftermath of the First World War (1914–1918). It is characterized as a reaction against doctrines of 19th-century liberal theology and a more positive reevaluation of the teachings of the Reformation, much of which had been in decline (especially in western Europe) since the late 18th century. It is primarily associated with two Swiss professors and pastors, Karl Barth (1886–1968) and Emil Brunner (1899–1966), even though Barth himself expressed his unease in the use of the term.

In dialectical theology the difference and opposition between God and human beings is stressed in such a way that all human attempts at overcoming this opposition through moral, religious or philosophical idealism must be characterized as 'sin'. In the death of Christ humanity is negated and overcome, but this judgment also points forwards to the resurrection in which humanity is reestablished in Christ. For Barth this meant that only through God's 'no' to everything human can his 'yes' be perceived. Applied to traditional themes of Protestant theology, such as double predestination, this means that election and reprobation cannot be viewed as a quantitative limitation of God's action. Rather it must be seen as its "qualitative definition". As Christ bore the rejection as well as the election of God for all humanity, every person is subject to both aspects of God's double predestination.

Dialectic prominently figured in Bernard Lonergan's philosophy, in his books Insight and Method in Theology. Michael Shute wrote about Lonergan's use of dialectic in The Origins of Lonergan's Notion of the Dialectic of History. For Lonergan, dialectic is both individual and operative in community. Simply described, it is a dynamic process that results in something new:

Dialectic is one of the eight functional specialties Lonergan envisaged for theology to bring this discipline into the modern world. Lonergan believed that the lack of an agreed method among scholars had inhibited substantive agreement from being reached and progress from being made compared to the natural sciences. Karl Rahner, S.J., however, criticized Lonergan's theological method in a short article entitled "Some Critical Thoughts on 'Functional Specialties in Theology'" where he stated: "Lonergan's theological methodology seems to me to be so generic that it really fits every science, and hence is not the methodology of theology as such, but only a very general methodology of science."

Criticisms 

Karl Popper has attacked the dialectic repeatedly. In 1937, he wrote and delivered a paper entitled "What Is Dialectic?" in which he attacked the dialectical method for its willingness "to put up with contradictions". Popper concluded the essay with these words: "The whole development of dialectic should be a warning against the dangers inherent in philosophical system-building. It should remind us that philosophy should not be made a basis for any sort of scientific system and that philosophers should be much more modest in their claims. One task which they can fulfill quite usefully is the study of the critical methods of science" (Ibid., p. 335).

In chapter 12 of volume 2 of The Open Society and Its Enemies (1944; 5th rev. ed., 1966), Popper unleashed a famous attack on Hegelian dialectics in which he held that Hegel's thought was to some degree responsible for facilitating the rise of fascism in Europe by encouraging and justifying irrationalism. (This was unjust in the view of some philosophers, such as Walter Kaufmann.) In section 17 of his 1961 "addenda" to The Open Society, entitled "Facts, Standards and Truth: A Further Criticism of Relativism", Popper refused to moderate his criticism of the Hegelian dialectic, arguing that it "played a major role in the downfall of the liberal movement in Germany [...] by contributing to historicism and to an identification of might and right, encouraged totalitarian modes of thought. [...] [And] undermined and eventually lowered the traditional standards of intellectual responsibility and honesty".

The philosopher of science and physicist Mario Bunge repeatedly criticized Hegelian and Marxian dialectics, calling them "fuzzy and remote from science" and a "disastrous legacy". He concluded: "The so-called laws of dialectics, such as formulated by Engels (1940, 1954) and Lenin (1947, 1981), are false insofar as they are intelligible."

Formalism

Defeasibility

Dialog games

Mathematics 
Mathematician William Lawvere interpreted dialectics in the setting of categorical logic in terms of adjunctions between idempotent monads. This perspective may be useful in the context of theoretical computer science where the duality between syntax and semantics can be interpreted as a dialectic in this sense. For example, the Curry-Howard equivalence is such an adjunction or more generally the duality between closed monoidal categories and their internal logic.

See also

References

Further reading 
 
 
  A broad survey of various conceptions of "dialectic", including disputational, cognitive, methodological, ontological, and philosophical.

External links 

 v:Dialectic algorithm – An algorithm based on the principles of classical dialectics
 
 

 
Rhetoric
Philosophical methodology